The Canadian province of New Brunswick contains 236 local service districts; another 80 former LSDs have been dissolved.

Planned reforms to New Brunswick's local governance system would abolish local service districts on 1 January 2023.

List of service districts 
Provincial government guidelines require capitalising the word parish only if it follows the specific part of the name: e.g. Flatlands Local Service District but the local service district of Flatlands.

Changes proposed for 2023 have been added; the percentages given in the report refer to LSDs' population according to the original report, not their land area. Maps will not be finalised until the appropriate Regulation is released; there are differences between maps released in March and the original boundary proposals. Because property lines are the basis for the new boundaries, small adjustments are too common to list.

Proposed names for the new municipal entities and rural districts were released on 24 May 2022.

Former local service districts

Special services areas 
The following are areas within local service districts that receive special services.

the parish of Acadieville
Acadie Siding
the parish of Alnwick
Barryville-New Jersey
the parish of Beresford
Alcida and Dauversière
Nicholas-Denys, Free Grant, Sainte-Rosette and Sormany
Nicholas-Denys, Free Grant and Sainte-Rosette
Sormany
Petit Rocher West (Petit-Rocher-Ouest)
Saint-Laurent
Saint-Laurent Nord
Sainte-Louise
Sainte-Thérèse Sud
the parish of Dorchester and the parish of Moncton
Calhoun Road
the parish of Douglas
Carlisle Road (chemin Carlisle)
Lower Douglas
the parish of Hampton
Fairmont Subdivision (Lotissement de Fairmont)
the parish of Havelock
Havelock Inside
the parish of Kingsclear
Oswald Gray
the parish of Maugerville
Inner Maugerville
the parish of Moncton
Greater Lakeburn
Irishtown
Painsec Junction
the parish of New Maryland
Howorth
Nasonworth

the parish of Sainte-Anne
Seigas
the parish of Saint George
Bonny River-Second Falls
the parish of Saint-Isidore
Bois-Blanc-Hacheyville-Duguayville
Bois-Blanc
the parish of Saint-Léonard
Poitier
Saint-Léonard-Parent
the parish of Saint-Louis
Canisto Road (chemin Canisto)
the parish of Saint Marys
Evergreen Park
Pepper Creek
the parish of Shippegan
Pointe Brûlée
the parish of Studholm
Lower Millstream
the parish of Sussex
Apohaqui
the parish of Wakefield
Wakefield Inside
the parish of Wellington
Bouctouche Cove
Desroches
Dixon Point-Route 134
Saint-Grégoire
the parish of Westfield
the Kingston Peninsula and Kennebecasis Island

See also 
2023 New Brunswick local governance reform

Notes

References

External links 
 Burton-Greater Geary Local Service District
 LSD of Dennis Weston
 District de services locaux de Grande-Digue
 Kingsclear Local Service District
 Lepreau LSD
 Petersville Local Service District-LSD
 Comité consultatif du District des Services Locaux de Robertville
 Rusagonis-Waasis LSD Information Page
 DSL St-Joseph
 Sainte-Marie-de-Kent
 Saint-Paul LSD
 Tabusintac Local Service District
 Barryville-New Jersey
 Weldford Local Service District Advisory Committee
 Western Charlotte Local Service District
 Westfield West and East Local Service District - LSD

Local government in New Brunswick

Lists of populated places in New Brunswick